is a 2019 Japanese crime film directed by Mika Ninagawa and written by Yumeaki Hirayama, based on a novel by Hirayama and a subsequent manga series by Takanori Kawai. The film stars Tina Tamashiro as Kanako, a young woman who is hired as a waitress at a restaurant owned by chef and former hitman Bombero (Tatsuya Fujiwara) that caters exclusively to professional killers.

Diner premiered at the Shanghai International Film Festival in China in June 2019, and was released in Japan on 5 July 2019.

Cast
 Tatsuya Fujiwara as Bombero
 Tina Tamashiro as Kanako Oba
 Masataka Kubota as Skin
 Kanata Hongō as Kid
 Eiji Okuda as Coffie
 Anna Tsuchiya as Maria
 Miki Maya as Bureizu

Critical reception
In a review of the film published by The Hollywood Reporter, it is written that "The entertainment quotient is high and should hit the outré spot with local teen audiences and manga addicts in general." Mark Schilling of The Japan Times gave the film a score of two-and-a-half out of five stars, writing that its visuals are "in the service of a thin story", and concluding: "A bacchanalia of the senses that threatens to end in stupefaction and silliness, Diner becomes a cracked ode to feminine power."

References

External links
 
 
 

2010s Japanese films
2010s Japanese-language films
2019 crime films
Films produced by Kazutoshi Wadakura